Aboksar may refer to:
 Aboksar, Sari
 Aboksar, Kolijan Rostaq, Sari County